The Football NSW 2015 season was the third season of football in New South Wales under the banner of the National Premier Leagues. The competition consisted of four divisions across the state of New South Wales, excluding those regions affiliated with the Northern NSW Football federation.

Blacktown City were Premiers of the 1st Division, and qualified for the National Premier Leagues finals series. Blacktown City won this competition, becoming the 2015 National Premier Leagues Champion, and additionally received a spot in the 2016 FFA Cup (entering at the Round of 32).

Pre-Season Changes

League Tables

2015 National Premier League NSW Men's 1

The National Premier League New South Wales 2015 season was played over 22 rounds, from March to August 2015.

Results

Finals

Personnel and kits

Top Scorers

2015 National Premier League NSW Men's 2

The 2015 National Premier League NSW Men's 2 was the third edition of the new NPL NSW 2 as the second level domestic association football competition in New South Wales. 12 teams competed, playing each other twice for a total of 22 rounds, with the top team at the end of the year promoted to the NPL NSW Men's 1 competition. Hakoah Sydney City East FC were promoted into the division after finishing 1st in the 2014 State League Division 1, and St George FC were relegated from the 2014 National Premier League's Men's 1.

Finals

2015 NSW State League Division 1

The 2015 NSW State League Division 1 was the third edition of the State League to be incorporated under the National Premier Leagues banner. 12 teams competed, playing each other twice for a total of 22 rounds.

Finals

2015 NSW State League Division 2

The 2015 NSW State League Division 2 was the third edition of the State League to be incorporated under the National Premier Leagues banner. 10 teams competed, playing each other twice for a total of 18 matches.

Finals

2015 National Premier League NSW Women's 1

The 2015 National Premier League NSW Women's 1 was the second edition of the NPL NSW Women's competition to be incorporated under the National Premier Leagues banner. 10 teams competed, playing each other twice for a total of 18 rounds.

Finals

2015 Waratah Cup

Football NSW soccer clubs competed in 2015 for the Waratah Cup. The tournament doubled as the NSW qualifier for the 2015 FFA Cup, with the top five clubs progressing to the Round of 32. 104 clubs entered the qualifying phase, with the clubs entering in a staggered format (with NPL and NPL 2 clubs seeded to a later round). The five winners then were randomly drawn in order to create a preliminary fixture, before the semi-finals of the competition.

The competition was won by Sydney United 58, their 5th title, defeating Blacktown City.

In addition to the A-League clubs Central Coast Mariners, Sydney FC and Western Sydney Wanderers, the five qualifiers (Balmain Tigers, Blacktown City, Rockdale City Suns, Sydney Olympic and Sydney United 58 competed in the final rounds of the 2015 FFA Cup. Of these qualifying clubs, only Rockdale City Suns, Sydney Olympic and Sydney United 58 progressed to the Round of 16.

Awards 
The NPL Gala Dinner was held on 11 September at Rosehill Gardens, acknowledging achievements from across all NPL teams from Men's 1, Men's 2, Women's 1, Women's 2 and their respective youth teams.

National Premier Leagues NSW

Other Awards

Notes

References

Football NSW